Matthew "Matt" Tunstall is a professional rugby league footballer who played as a  or  forward in the 2000s. He played at representative level for Scotland, and at club level for Workington Town and Whitehaven.

International honours
Matt Tunstall won 2 caps (plus 2 as substitute) for Scotland in 2003–2004 while at Workington Town.

References

Living people
Place of birth missing (living people)
Scotland national rugby league team players
Whitehaven R.L.F.C. players
Workington Town players
Year of birth missing (living people)
Rugby league second-rows
Rugby league props